Miwa is both a Japanese given name and a surname.

Miwa may also refer to:

Place
 Miwa, Aichi (美和町), Japan
 Miwa, Fukuoka (三輪町), Japan
 Miwa, Hiroshima (三和町), Japan
 Miwa, Kyoto (三和町), Japan
 Miwa, Yamaguchi (美和町), Japan

Other uses
 Miwa people, an Indigenous Australian people
 Miwa Station, a train station in Nara Prefecture, Japan
 Mount Miwa, a mountain located in Nara Prefecture, Japan
 8855 Miwa, a Main-belt Asteroid